Kaak is  a bread from Pakistan.

Kaak may also refer to :
Kaak (cartoonist), a cartoonist from India
KAAK, an American FM radio station
Ka'ak, a cake from Arabia

See also
Kaaks, a place in Germany